Pollenia mayeri is a species of cluster fly in the family Polleniidae.

Distribution 
Belarus, Czech Republic, Germany, Hungary, Netherlands, Poland, Romania, Slovakia, Ukraine.

References 

Polleniidae
Insects described in 1941
Diptera of Europe